Paul Anderson (born Paul Napier Anderson, 28 April 1966, Driffield, Yorkshire, England) is an English cricketer, who played one match for Yorkshire County Cricket Club in 1988, against the Sri Lanka touring team at Headingley on 10 August 1988.  He took one wicket for 47, opening the bowling and bowled their captain, Ranjan Madugalle for 48, and caught their opener, Brendon Kuruppu, off the bowling of Paul Booth for 19. Anderson scored a duck at number 11 in his only first-class innings.

He batted right-handed and bowled right-arm medium pace.  He played two Yorkshire Second XI matches in 1987, and thirteen in 1988.  He also appeared for Warwickshire under-25s.

Paul Anderson now owns Indigo Napier based in Hawke's Bay, New Zealand.

References

External links
Cricinfo Profile
Cricket Archive Statistics
Indigo: The Napier bar that now has 1000 different bottles of whisky on its drink list
Indigo owner on a good whiskey

1966 births
Living people
English cricketers
Yorkshire cricketers
People from Driffield
Cricketers from Yorkshire